Repertory Philippines Foundation Inc. (REP) is a Filipino theater company dedicated to showcasing English-language productions.

History
Repertory Philippines was established in 1967 by Zenaida Amador and Baby Barredo. Its first production was a Tagalog-language adaptation of Miss Julie by August Strindberg, directed by Rolando Tinio. In its early years, REP experienced difficulty in attracting audiences for its plays; the owners assessed that the paying audience preferred plays in English and those authored by American and European playwrights. REP's debut play Miss Julie had poor viewership which led the theater company to focus on English-language plays. With the patronage of Jaime Zobel de Ayala, the viewership of REP's plays gradually increased. Most of the theater group's productions were derived from classic English-language plays and Broadway musicals.

In 1988, REP-trained actors including Lea Salonga and Monique Wilson were selected to join the original West End company of Cameron Mackintosh's Miss Saigon.

Venues
Since 2002, Repertory Philippines' home venue is the OnStage Theater at the Greenbelt shopping mall in Makati. Prior to that period, REP did productions at the Insular Life Auditorium in Makati (1967–1992) and the William Shaw Theater at Shangri-La Plaza, Mandaluyong (1992–2002). The theater group also did plays at the Cultural Center of the Philippines, the Meralco Theater, and the now-defunct Rizal Theater in Makati.

Reputation
Repertory Philippines is known for producing plays in English – a subject of criticism by Filipino nationalists, although the theater company has a policy of not hiring foreign actors for the lead roles in their plays.

See also
Philippine Educational Theater Association

References

Theater companies in Metro Manila
1967 establishments in the Philippines
Companies based in Makati